Armstrong Glacier is a glacier flowing from the south side of Mount Bagshawe westward into George VI Sound. It provides the only known safe route for mechanical vehicles from George VI Sound to the Palmer Land plateau. It was named by the United Kingdom Antarctic Place-Names Committee for Edward B. Armstrong, British Antarctic Survey surveyor at Stonington Island, 1964–65.

See also
 List of glaciers in the Antarctic
 Glaciology

References
 

Glaciers of Palmer Land